Manjeri Kyebakutika is a Ugandan legislator and politician for Jinja City in the Busoga Sub-region in the eleventh  Parliament of Uganda. She is affiliated to the National Unity Platform (NUP).

Political career 
Manjeri was elected into the eleventh parliament as the member of parliament for Jinja city. Manjeri was appointed as the deputy chief chip of the eleventh parliament of Uganda. She was arrested for putting on a red barret for NUP while addressing the press after attending the Kyabazinga's coronation anniversary at Iganga palace in Jinja and after arrest, Manjeri accused the Uganda Police for torturing her leaving her with chest and back injuries.

Other works 
Manjeri informed the Ugandan parliament about the insecurity in Jinja City due to the panic caused by panga welding criminals who threatened to kill people and that police was not deployed to avert the attacks. She asked the government to return what belongs to Busoga Sub-region and obwa'kyabazinga of Busoga as in land, forests, district headquarters and properties currently occupied by government agencies among others. She complained to the government about not turning Busoga university into a public university. Manjeri donated food and hand washing dispensers to the people she represents in the parliament of Uganda. She raised a concern in the Ugandan parliament about the brutality used by Umeme staff in Jinja which included beating, using tear gas to disperse crowds during their operations on illegal electricity connections in Jinja City.

See also 

 List of members of the eleventh Parliament of Uganda
 Sauda Kauma
 Parliament of Uganda
 Jinja
 National Unity Platform (NUP)

References 

Living people
Members of the Parliament of Uganda
Women members of the Parliament of Uganda
21st-century Ugandan women politicians
21st-century Ugandan politicians
National Unity Platform politicians
Year of birth missing (living people)